These are the list of personnel changes in the NBA from the 1970–71 NBA season.

Events

July 8, 1970
 The Phoenix Suns traded Heywood Dotson to the New York Knicks for a 1971 5th round draft pick (Bob Kissane was later selected).

July 27, 1970
 The Phoenix Suns waived Neil Johnson.

August 28, 1970
 The Los Angeles Lakers claimed Fred Hetzel on waivers from the Portland Trail Blazers.

September 10, 1970
 The San Diego Rockets traded Art Williams to the Boston Celtics for a 1971 5th round draft pick (Greg Nelson was later selected).

September 15, 1970
 The Chicago Bulls signed A.W. Holt as a free agent.

September 17, 1970
 The Milwaukee Bucks traded Zaid Abdul-Aziz and cash to the Seattle SuperSonics for Lucius Allen and Bob Boozer.

September 23, 1970
 The San Francisco Warriors signed Nick Jones as a free agent.

September 28, 1970
 The Seattle SuperSonics signed Tom Black as a free agent.

September 29, 1970
 The Cleveland Cavaliers signed Gary Suiter as a free agent.

October 2, 1970
 The Boston Celtics sold Jim Barnes to the Baltimore Bullets.

October 5, 1970
 The Cincinnati Royals signed Moe Barr as a free agent.
 The Milwaukee Bucks signed Bobby Washington as a free agent.
 The Milwaukee Bucks signed Jeff Webb as a free agent.

October 7, 1970
 The Portland Trail Blazers sold Pat Riley to the Los Angeles Lakers.

October 13, 1970
 The Chicago Bulls signed Jim King as a free agent.

October 14, 1970
 The Cincinnati Royals signed Bob Arnzen as a free agent.

October 15, 1970
 The Cleveland Cavaliers signed Cliff Anderson as a free agent.

October 16, 1970
 The Philadelphia 76ers traded Darrall Imhoff and a future draft pick to the Cincinnati Royals for Connie Dierking and Fred Foster.
 The Philadelphia 76ers traded Matt Guokas to the Chicago Bulls for a 1971 2nd round draft pick (Marvin Stewart was later selected).

October 20, 1970
 The Chicago Bulls traded Shaler Halimon to the Portland Trail Blazers for a 1971 2nd round draft pick (Willie Sojourner was later selected).

October 22, 1970
 The Portland Trail Blazers traded Dorie Murrey to the Baltimore Bullets for a 1971 2nd round draft pick (Rick Fisher was later selected).

October 26, 1970
 The Portland Trail Blazers signed Bill Stricker as a free agent.

October 28, 1970
 The Atlanta Hawks claimed Len Chappell on waivers from the Cleveland Cavaliers.

November 11, 1970
 The Los Angeles Lakers traded John Tresvant to the Baltimore Bullets for a 1972 2nd round draft pick (Paul Stovall was later selected).

November 12, 1970
 The Cleveland Cavaliers signed Larry Mikan as a free agent.

November 16, 1970
 The Portland Trail Blazers waived Bill Stricker.

November 26, 1970
 The Buffalo Braves traded Freddie Crawford to the Philadelphia 76ers for a future draft pick.

December 9, 1970
 The Cleveland Cavaliers traded Johnny Egan to the San Diego Rockets for a 1971 3rd round draft pick (Jackie Ridgle was later selected).

December 12, 1970
 The Cleveland Cavaliers claimed Bobby Washington on waivers from the Milwaukee Bucks.

December 17, 1970
 The Philadelphia 76ers signed Cliff Anderson as a free agent.

December 30, 1970
 The Seattle SuperSonics signed Spencer Haywood as a free agent. The NBA sued Seattle because Haywood violated rules stating a player could not join the league until he was four years out of high school; the Supreme Court ruled in favor of Seattle on March 8, 1971.

January 17, 1971
 The San Francisco Warriors signed Bill Turner as a free agent.

January 20, 1971
 The Pittsburgh Condors traded Howard Porter to the Chicago Bulls for Paul Ruffner and cash.

January 26, 1971
 The Chicago Bulls waived A.W. Holt.

January 29, 1971
 The Cincinnati Royals claimed Willie Williams on waivers from the Boston Celtics.

February 1, 1971
 The Milwaukee Bucks traded Gary Freeman and a 1971 2nd round draft pick (Willie Long was later selected) to the Cleveland Cavaliers for McCoy McLemore.

February 10, 1971
 The Cincinnati Royals claimed Tom Black on waivers from the Seattle SuperSonics.

March 23, 1971
 The Portland Trail Blazers traded Jim Barnett to the San Francisco Warriors for a 1971 2nd round draft pick (Charlie Yelverton was later selected), a 1971 3rd round draft pick (William Smith was later selected) and a 1972 2nd round draft pick (Dave Twardzik was later selected).

March 29, 1971
 The Cincinnati Royals traded Flynn Robinson to the Los Angeles Lakers for a 1971 2nd round draft pick (Joe Bergman was later selected).

April 2, 1971
The Detroit Pistons traded Otto Moore to the Phoenix Suns for a 1972 1st round draft pick (Bob Nash was later selected).

April 6, 1971
The Portland Trail Blazers waived Claude English.

April 8, 1971
 Alex Hannum resigns as head coach for the San Diego Rockets.

April 15, 1971
 The Chicago Bulls waived George Johnson.

May 7, 1971
 The New York Knicks traded Cazzie Russell to the San Francisco Warriors for Jerry Lucas.

May 14, 1971
 The Houston Rockets hired Tex Winter as head coach.
 The Cincinnati Royals traded Charlie Paulk to the Chicago Bulls for Matt Guokas and a future draft pick.

June 3, 1971
 The Los Angeles Lakers fired Joe Mullaney as head coach.

June 9, 1971
 The Chicago Bulls traded Dick Gibbs to the San Diego Rockets for a 1973 2nd round draft pick (Kevin Stacom was later selected).

References
NBA Transactions at NBA.com
1970-71 NBA Transactions| Basketball-Reference.com

Transactions
NBA transactions